Rinaldo Santini (27 December 1914 – 6 July 2013) was an Italian Christian Democrat politician. He was born in Rome, Kingdom of Italy. He was mayor of Rome (1967–1969) and president of Lazio (1973–1975). He died in Rome, Italy.

References

External links
 

1914 births
2013 deaths
20th-century Italian politicians
21st-century Italian politicians
Christian Democracy (Italy) politicians
Mayors of Rome
Presidents of Lazio
Grand Officers of the Order of Merit of the Italian Republic